The 2016 Federated Auto Parts 400 was a NASCAR Sprint Cup Series stock car race held on September 10, 2016 at Richmond International Raceway in Richmond, Virginia. Contested over 407 laps—extended from 400 laps due to an overtime finish, on the  D-shaped short track. It was the 26th race of the 2016 NASCAR Sprint Cup Series season, and the final race of the regular season before the playoffs. Joe Gibbs Racing's Denny Hamlin won his second career race at his home track from the pole and his third race of the 2016 season.

Kyle Larson made his way to a second place finish, the race had seven lead changes among different drivers, as well as a new track record with sixteen cautions for 89 laps, and one red flag for 20 minutes and 23 seconds.

Report

Background

Richmond International Raceway (RIR) is a 3/4-mile (1.2 km), D-shaped, asphalt race track located just outside Richmond, Virginia in Henrico County. It hosts the NASCAR Sprint Cup Series and Xfinity Series.  Known as "America's premier short track", it formerly hosted a NASCAR Camping World Truck Series race, an IndyCar Series race and two USAC sprint car races.

Entry list
The preliminary entry list for the race included 41 cars and was released on September 5, 2016 at 12:07 p.m. Eastern time.

Practice

First practice

Final practice

Qualifying
Asked why it took so long in the season to get a pole, Hamlin said he had "no idea. We were second and third so many times it was crazy. We were actually looking at the rainouts and were like, ‘We’re going to start seventh because of the rainouts. It hurts our average.’” He also added that Richmond was his "hometown (being from nearby Chesterfield County, Virginia), so I’d probably be a little more aggressive than I would at any other racetrack, but ultimately this race isn’t going to make or break a championship run for us, but it surely would do a whole lot for momentum and feel-good going into the Chase if we could win."

Qualifying results

Race

First half
Under mostly clear evening Virginia skies, Denny Hamlin led the field to the green flag at 7:47. Ryan Blaney brought out the first caution of the race on lap 10 after suffering a tire blowout and slamming the wall in turn 1.

The race restarted on lap 16. The field settled into place and rode around the track. Martin Truex Jr. took the lead from Hamlin on lap 52. The second caution of the race flew on lap 85 for A. J. Allmendinger spinning out in turn 4. Kurt Busch exited pit road with the race lead after missing his pit stall. He came back in and the lead went to Hamlin. During the caution, Greg Biffle got into and turned Tony Stewart on pit road. Jimmie Johnson and Kasey Kahne were sent to the tail end of the field for speeding on pit road.

The race restarted on lap 92. The third caution of the race flew on lap 96 for Chase Elliott suffering a tire blowout and slamming the wall on the frontstretch.

The race restarted on lap 100. For the next 102 laps, the race ran green. Truex took back the race lead on the restart and held it until Johnson suffered a tire blowout, slammed the turn 1 wall and brought out the fourth caution of the race on lap 202.

Second half

The race restarted on lap 212. Debris on the frontstretch brought out the fifth caution of the race on lap 223. Brad Keselowski was sent to the tail end of the field for speeding.

The race restarted on lap 228. Kurt Busch held the lead for two laps before Truex took it back. Matt Kenseth took the lead from Truex on lap 246 as the sixth caution of the race flew for David Ragan suffering a tire blowout and slamming the wall in turn 1. Regan Smith opted not to pit when the lead lap cars did and assumed the lead, but came down two laps later and handed the lead to Hamlin. Five drivers were sent to the rear for various penalties during the caution: Kevin Harvick and Ragan for speeding, Aric Almirola and Kenseth for a pit box violation, and Brian Scott for too many crew members over the wall.

The race restarted on lap 251. The seventh caution of the race flew on lap 266 for Paul Menard rear-ending the wall in turn 2. He went on to finish 40th. Kyle Larson exited pit road with the race lead. Danica Patrick (commitment line violation) and Truex (speeding) were sent to the tail end of the field for pit road infractions.

The race restarted on lap 272. Hamlin powered by Larson to retake the lead on lap 273. The eighth caution of the race flew on lap 280 for a single-car wreck involving Casey Mears in turn 3.

The race restarted on lap 285. The ninth caution of the race flew on lap 292 after Michael Annett suffered a tire blowout and slammed the wall in turn 2. Larson exited pit road with the race lead.

The race restarted with 104 laps to go. Truex worked his way back to the lead with 96 laps to go. The 10th caution of the race flew with 78 laps to go for a single-car wreck in turn 2 involving Carl Edwards. Hamlin exited pit road with the race lead. Ryan Newman (speeding) and Ricky Stenhouse Jr. (pit box violation) were sent to the tail end of the field for pit road infractions.

The race restarted with 73 laps to go. The 11th caution of the race flew with 71 laps to go for Allmendinger slamming the wall in turn 1.

The race restarted with 67 laps to go. The 12th caution of the race flew with 63 laps to go for Kenseth slamming the wall in turn 2. This came after contact with Keselowski on the previous restart. Kenseth said after the race that he was sure Keselowski would "send a Tweet out or go on a TV show and explain how it wasn't his fault. But he knows better than that. He knows his angle was bad and he just drove way up in the corner because he made a mistake and he was trying to make up for it and had no respect for anybody on the outside lane. Unfortunately, we had a wrecked car because of it." Keselowski said he "just missed a shift and ruined Matt's day. ... I made a mistake, and it was kind of crappy for everyone. Hopefully, he’ll accept the apology. … That’s not what anybody wants to see, including myself.”

The race restarted with 56 laps to go. The 13th caution of the race flew with 53 laps to go for Allmendinger wrecking on the fronstretch.

The race restarted with 49 laps to go. The 14th caution of the race flew with 45 laps to go for Matt DiBenedetto suffering a tire blowout and slamming the wall in turn 3.

The race restarted with 38 laps to go. The 15th caution of the race flew with 36 laps to go for an eight-car wreck in turn 3. It started when Stewart came down across the nose of Newman's car and sent both of them into the wall. As they continued traveling, more cars were collected as Ragan slammed into the back of Newman's car, Scott slammed into Ragan's car and Dylan Lupton got into Newman and his car ended up off the ground. Newman said afterwards that Stewart "has got issues. We all know he’s got issues. He proved it again tonight. I was clearly inside of him getting into Turn 1, he cut across my nose, I was on the brakes, on the apron and I hit him coming off of Turn 2, but only because I got loose, I was on the apron. The next thing I know he is driving across my nose on the back straightaway because he’s Tony Stewart and he thinks he owns everything. It’s unfortunate, but shouldn’t expect anything less from him.” Stewart responded to Newman's comments saying his former teammate "had to press the issue tonight and put himself in a couple of bad spots. There’s 39 other guys you can put yourself in bad spots with. Don’t put yourself in a bad spot with me and don’t start shoving me around the racetrack because he knows from experience I don’t put up with it.” “It’s an important race," Stewart added. "He was in a pressure situation coming into here and I had nothing to do with the first 25 races to put him in a pressure situation. You expect to get run into once or twice but the third time’s the charm and that’s when I had enough of it. I wrecked myself doing it. So it wasn’t like I didn’t wreck myself doing it. I’m not really sure that I’m going to lose a lot of sleep over his opinion.”

The red flag then came out to ensue to facilitate cleanup around the track, After 20 minutes and 23 seconds, the red flag was lifted and the field continued under caution.

The race restarted with 31 laps to go. Hamlin was pulling away from the field and had the race all but locked up until Smith suffered a tire blowout, slammed the wall in turn 3 and brought out the 16th caution of the race with two laps to go.

Overtime
The race restarted with two laps to go, six laps past the 400 lap advertised distance, and Hamlin scored the victory while Kurt Busch spun out coming to the overtime line.

Post-race

Driver comments
Hamlin said in victory lane that winning the race "feels great. I’ll tell you, our cars were really running well. Wheels and the whole group just gave me a great car. Really got it tuned in there the last half of the race. Just good restarts, finally everything just kind of worked well for us all day. I didn’t think staying out was the right thing to do, but great call there, and actually, I got this from one of our Toyota guests on his birthday day today. He gave me this. He said it helped him get through tough times, so kept that in the car, and thank Eli for that.”

Race results

Race summary
 Lead changes: 7 among different drivers
 Cautions/Laps: 16 for 89
 Red flags: 1 for 20 minutes and 23 seconds
 Time of race: 3 hours, 31 minutes and 33 seconds
 Average speed:

Media

Television
NBC Sports covered the race on the television side. Rick Allen, Jeff Burton and Steve Letarte had the call in the booth for the race. Dave Burns, Mike Massaro, Marty Snider and Kelli Stavast reported from pit lane during the race.

Radio
The Motor Racing Network had the radio call for the race, which was simulcast on Sirius XM NASCAR Radio.

Standings after the race

Drivers' Championship standings after Chase reset

Manufacturers' Championship standings

Note: Only the first sixteen positions are included for the driver standings.

References

Federated Auto Parts 400
Federated Auto Parts 400
NASCAR races at Richmond Raceway
Federated Auto Parts 400